Maciej Henneberg (born 1949) is a Polish-Australian Wood Jones Professor of Anthropological and Comparative Anatomy at the University of Adelaide, Australia. He has held this position since 1996 and specialises in human evolution, forensic science, human anatomy, as well as physical anthropology. He has held various academic positions at the University of Oxford, the University of Texas at Austin, the University of Cape Town, and the University of Zurich.

His work has been widely published and commented on in the news media. Henneberg is often called upon for comment by journalists investigating his areas of expertise. Similarly, he has appeared in numerous Australian courts to provide expert evidence.

Education and early life
Henneberg graduated summa cum laude in 1973 in Biology (Physical Anthropology) at Adam Mickiewicz University, Poznan, Poland. In 1976 he received a PhD from the same institution. His thesis was entitled, "Biological Dynamics of a Polish Rural Community in the 19th Century". He received another degree in 1981 in Natural Sciences.

In 1981, Henneberg was imprisoned by the Polish People's Republic for his role in the Solidarity trade union movement and his efforts to reconstitute the academic board at his university, as well as organise strikes. He was imprisoned without trial for 100 days, became ill and was hospitalised. He was exiled from Poland in 1984.

Academic career
In 2002, the President of Poland awarded Henneberg Professor of Biological Sciences, the highest academic award in Poland, in recognition of his academic achievements. Henneberg is perhaps most famous for the work he has co-authored since 2004 which claims that the 'Hobbit Man' was most likely a homo sapiens, probably with Down syndrome. Homo floresiensis, also known as 'Hobbit Man', was discovered around the same time as The Lord of the Rings trilogy was in cinemas and generated considerable global news media interest. Henneberg's team have been labelled "Hobbit deniers" as a result of their research.

In 2011, Henneberg discovered that Australian citizens height had plateaued since the 1990s and that this disproved popular notions of perpetual growth in the height of humans beyond the last hundred years. Henneberg's team of researchers theorised in 2013 that another popular notion - that of humans being more intelligent than other animals - is inaccurate, as species merely think differently. He has also stated a belief that available evidence indicates humans predominantly engage in intercourse for pleasure, rather than procreation.

Henneberg believes that evolutionary biologists are so enthusiastic to declare new species and links in human evolution that they have overlook the possibility that each species, like Neanderthals, are merely variations of homo sapiens. In The Dynamic Human, Henneberg and Arthur Saniotis argue that human evolution is still occurring, though at a slower rate because of technological advancement. It is further argued that technology may advance to a point where it becomes hard to distinguish between "human and machine".

In 2016, Henneberg co-authored an article which demonstrates that the consumption of meat contributes to obesity to the same extent as the consumption of sugar. This is because protein is processed by the human body after fats and carbohydrates, which are conventionally thought to contribute to weight gain.

Controversy
In 2008, Henneberg was suspended from the University of Adelaide pending an investigation of possible fraud. As head of department, the university held him technically responsible for the disappearance of $400,000 in an account he did not personally manage. Henneberg was later cleared of wrongdoing and reinstated by the university with an official apology published in The Advertiser.

References 

Academic staff of the University of Adelaide
Australian anthropologists
Polish emigrants to Australia
Adam Mickiewicz University in Poznań alumni
Academic staff of the University of Zurich
1949 births
Living people